Marie-Thérèse Kerschbaumer (born 31 August 1936) is an Austrian novelist and poet, one of the leading women prose writers in German. Her mainly fictional works present the horrors of Fascism, especially the repression of minorities.

Early life and education
Kerschbaumer was born in Garches near Paris where her Cuban father and Austrian mother were living to escape the Spanish Civil War. After spending her childhood years mainly in Costa Rica and the Austrian Tyrol, she worked in England for a year when she was 17 and then went on to Italy. In 1957, she returned to Austria to further her education. From 1963, she studied Romance languages at Vienna University and spent two years in Romania before earning a doctorate in Romanian linguistics in 1973. In 1971, she married the painter Helmut Kurz-Goldenstein.

Career
After completing her studies, Kerschbaumer worked as a translator, mainly from Spanish. Her first novel, Der Schwimmer (The Swimmer) was published in 1976, describing how inmates tried to escape from an institution in the Spanish State. In 1980, she publishing Der weibliche Name des Widerstands (The Feminine Name of Resistance) consisting of seven fictional accounts of women in concentration camps during the world war. A combination of documentary literature and creative writing, the work appeared as a television film the following year and was published as a popular paperback edition in 1982. Her third work, Schwestern (Sisters, 1982) is a novel tracing the experiences of several generations of an Austrian family as the events of the 20th century affect their lives. Kerschbaumer has also written plays which have been well received on Austrian radio but have not been published.

From 1992 to 2000, she wrote the three novels of the Die Fremde series, an autobiographical trilogy tracing the life of a girl born in the Austrian alps, who goes to France and England before studying Italian language and art in Tuscany. Her most recent work, Wasser und Wind (Water and Wind, 2006) is a collection of poems written from 1988 and 2005.

References

External links
List of works from Literaturhaus Wien

1936 births
Living people
People from Nanterre
Writers from Vienna
20th-century Austrian novelists
21st-century Austrian novelists
Austrian women novelists
Austrian women poets
Austrian translators
20th-century Austrian women writers
21st-century Austrian women writers
20th-century translators